Stormquest, also known as El ojo de la tormenta (in Spanish: "The Eye of the Storm"), is a 1987 Argentine-American sword and sorcery fantasy adventure film directed by  and written by Charles R. Saunders, based on a story Sessa created for the film. It was not released commercially in cinemas, and it was instead launched directly to the video market in USA in 1988. It was one of the last entries in a total of ten movies Roger Corman made in Argentina.

Synopsis
In an ancient female-ruled society, two women come to believe that the treatment of men is wrong.

References

External links
 

1987 films
1980s Argentine films